Wilbur Edwin Murdoch (March 14, 1875 – October 29, 1941) was a backup outfielder in Major League Baseball who played briefly for the St. Louis Cardinals during the  season. He threw right-handed. His batting side is unknown.

A native of Avon, New York, Murdoch was 33 years old when he entered the majors with the Cardinals. In a 27-game career, he was a .258 hitter (16-for-62) with five runs and five RBI, including three doubles and four stolen bases without home runs.
 
Murdoch died in Los Angeles, California, at the age of 66.

External links
Baseball Almanac
Baseball Reference
Retrosheet

St. Louis Cardinals players
Major League Baseball outfielders
Baseball players from New York (state)
1875 births
1941 deaths
Seattle Clamdiggers players
Tacoma Tigers players
Spokane Blue Stockings players
Charleston Sea Gulls players
Macon Brigands players
Macon Peaches players
People from Avon, New York